Detective School Q is a Japanese anime television series based on the manga of the same name, written by Seimaru Amagi and illustrated by Fumiya Satō. Animated by Pierrot and directed by Noriyuki Abe, the series was broadcast for forty-five episodes on TBS from 15 April 2003 to 20 March 2004. The episodes were collected in twelve DVD sets, released by Marvelous Entertainment between 23 August 2003 and 24 July 2004.

Episode list

References

Detective Academy Q